The 2011 FIA GT1 Paul Ricard round is an auto racing event held at the Circuit Paul Ricard, Le Castellet, France on 15–17 July, and was the seventh round of the 2011 FIA GT1 World Championship season. It was the FIA GT1 World Championship's second race held at the  Paul Ricard. The event was supported by the FIA GT3 European Championship, Lamborghini Blancpain Super Trofeo and British Formula 3 Championship.

Background

The team of Marc VDS Racing Team who run four Ford GT's were doubtful to run in this round as engine supply issues could have forced them to miss the Paul Ricard round, meaning there could have been just twelve cars competing.
After a collision between the two Swiss Racing Team Lamborghini's at the Sachsenring round, the team were scheduled to return at this event with one car but then decided to withdraw it from the third event in a row. Andreas Zuber is back behind the wheel of the No. 11 Exim Bank Corvette alongside regular Mike Hezemans. Frédéric Makowiecki also returns for Marc VDS Racing Team competing with Maxime Martin in car No. 41 replacing Bertrand Baguette.

Qualifying

Qualifying result
For qualifying, Driver 1 participates in the first and third sessions while Driver 2 participates in only the second session.  The fastest lap for each session is indicated with bold.

Races

Qualifying Race

Race result

Championship Race

Race result

References

External links
 Paul Ricard GT1 Race in France – FIA GT1 World Championship

Paul Ricard
FIA GT1